is a public university in the city of Kumamoto, Kumamoto, Japan. The predecessor of the school was founded in 1947. The school population is approximately 2,200 students and 100 faculty members.

External links
 Official website

Educational institutions established in 1947
Public universities in Japan
Buildings and structures in Kumamoto
1947 establishments in Japan
Universities and colleges in Kumamoto Prefecture